Castelo de Vide is a municipality in Portugal, with a population of 3,407 inhabitants in 2011, in an area of .

History

It is unclear when humans settled Castelo de Vide, although archaeologists suggest the decision came from the morphology of the soil and from a territorial strategy to occupy and conquer land. The establishment of a fortification helped fix a new population to the territory and, at the same, functioned as a strategic border fortress. Castelo de Vide became its own municipality in 1276, before which it was part of Marvão.

In 1299 Rui de Pina wrote that Castelo de Vide remained a weak stronghold, stating "lugar etã mais chão q forte" (the locality is more place then strong). Afonso Sanches, son of king Afonso III, rebuilt the fortification walls, and his brother King Denis continued the task, with work completed during the reign of King Afonso IV sometime in the 14th century. These changes improved the stronghold's defensive conditions, including moving a well into the interior and a new line of walls protecting the citadel and houses previously outside the walls. A tower keep was constructed flush with the southern walls in order to better defend the southern passage. All these improvements proved useful during Portugal's conflicts with Castile, when siege engines were used.

Throughout the 14th century the settlement slowly expanded outside the castle walls. The southern flanks, with good southerly exposure and a gentle slope, allowed easy settlement, while the northern and western exposures expanded later due to wind and steep cliff faces. The growth of the settlement occurred along the main road leading to the castle, and followed the expansion of religious buildings outside the walls. This road bisected two sides of the hill and one side was occupied by a Jewish quarter inhabited by Jews expelled from Castile and Aragon.

Written documents attest to the existence of Castelo de Vide's Jewish community and quarter throughout the 14th and 15th centuries. The 14th-century Synagogue of Castelo de Vide in Santa Maria da Devesa still stands, and despite Portugal's expulsion of Jews in 1496 was used by Marranos as a religious sanctuary and school until the 16th century. Today it houses a small museum dedicated to Castelo de Vide's historical Jewish community.

Many of the perceptions of the town came from the 16th century drawings of Duarte d'Armas. At that time the settlement was dedicated to agriculture (cultivation of wine grapes, cotton, olives, fruits, and cereals) and raising cattle, while watermills were constructed along the ravines in Vide and Nisa. At the beginning of the 16th century, toward the end of King John III's reign, the wool industry became important in the region. This resulted in Castelo de Vide's inhabitants being referred to as Cardadores ("carders"). Castelo de Vide had 885 inhabitants in 1527, rising to 1,400 by 1572 and 1,600 by 1603; this population growth resulted from growth in agricultural production, the textile industry, and commerce with Spain.

The new foral ("charter"), issued by King Manuel I in 1512 established new laws for public spaces and set the town's boundaries.

Geography
The municipality is located by the Serra de São Mamede in Portalegre District.

Administratively, the municipality is divided into 4 civil parishes (freguesias):
 Nossa Senhora da Graça de Póvoa e Meadas
 Santa Maria da Devesa
 Santiago Maior
 São João Baptista

Climate

Notable people 
 João de Casal (1641–1735), Bishop of Macau
 Garcia de Orta (ca.1501 – 1568) a Portuguese Renaissance Sephardi Jewish physician, herbalist and naturalist; a pioneer of tropical medicine, pharmacognosy and ethnobotany, working mainly in Goa
 Mouzinho da Silveira (1780–1849) a statesman, jurist, Portuguese politician and an important player in the Liberal Revolution of 1820
 Salgueiro Maia (1944–1992) a captain in the Portuguese army, he made a significant contribution to the Carnation Revolution

Gallery

References
Notes

Sources

External links

Town Hall official website
Some photographs of Castelo de Vide, taken in 2007
33 photos of Castelo de Vide

Populated places in Portalegre District
Municipalities of Portalegre District
People from Castelo de Vide